Queen's Park is a district of the town of Northampton, England.

Queen's Park is located due north of the town centre and immediately south of Kingsthorpe. It is bisected by the primary A508 road, to the west of this road is an Industrial Estate while to the east it is residential in nature. The population is included in the Trinity ward of Northampton Council.

External links 

Areas of Northampton